Ryberg is a surname. Notable people with the surname include:

Freja Ryberg (1832-1920), Finnish stage actress
Inez Scott Ryberg (1901–1980), American classical archaeologist and academic
Ivar Ryberg (1885–1929), Swedish rower
Roger Ryberg (born 1952), Norwegian politician
W. Greg Ryberg (born 1946), American politician